Walter Bullough (21 October 1855 – 17 September 1888) was an Australian cricketer. He played two first-class matches for South Australia in 1880/81.

He died suddenly in 1888 and was survived by a wife and five children, who were left unprovided for after his death. A call for admirers of his cricket career to donate for their well-being was advertised shortly after his death.

References

External links
 

1855 births
1888 deaths
Australian cricketers
South Australia cricketers
People from Hunslet